Vinton County High School is a public high school in Elk Township, just outside the village limits of McArthur, Ohio, United States.  It is the only high school in the Vinton County Local School District.  Athletic teams are known as the Vikings.

History 

Vinton County High School was formed after all of the other schools consolidated into one high school.

Notable alumni and faculty
 Dick Bates, Major League Baseball pitcher
 Thomas S. Crow, Master Chief Petty Officer of the Navy

Athletics

The Vikings belong to the Ohio High School Athletic Association (OHSAA) and the Tri-Valley Conference, a 16-member athletic conference located in southeastern Ohio.  The conference is divided into two divisions based on school size.  The Ohio Division features the larger schools, including Vinton County, and the Hocking Division features the smaller schools.

See also 
 Ohio High School Athletic Conferences

References

External links
 District Website

High schools in Vinton County, Ohio
Ohio high school sports conferences
Public high schools in Ohio